Pimchanok Luevisadpaibul (born 30 September 1992), nicknamed Baifern (lit. "Fern Leaf"), is a Thai actress and model. She rose to fame for her lead role as Nam in the 2010 sleeper movie hit Crazy Little Thing Called Love with co-star Mario Maurer. She has been a freelance actress since 2016.

Early life
Pimchanok "Baifern" Luevisadpaibul, a Thai actress with a Chinese descent was born on September 30, 1992 in Dusit, Bangkok, Thailand. She started working in the Thai entertainment as a model for popular student shoes. At that time, she was studying grade 6 at primary school.

After that, she began to appear in short films, movies, and music videos.

She completed a bachelor’s degree from Srinakharinwirot University in the Filmography department.

She rose to fame after playing ‘Nam’ in the hit rom-com movie ‘A Little Thing Called Love’ with co-star Mario Maurer.

She has a younger brother named Field Jirathit.

Filmography

Film

Television series

MC 
 Online 
 2021 : FERNZONE EP.1 On Air YouTube:FERNZONE Channel

Music video appearances

Advertising

Awards and nominations

References

External links
 
 
 
 

Living people
1992 births
Pimchanok Luevisadpaibul
Pimchanok Luevisadpaibul
Pimchanok Luevisadpaibul
Pimchanok Luevisadpaibul
Pimchanok Luevisadpaibul
Pimchanok Luevisadpaibul
Pimchanok Luevisadpaibul
Pimchanok Luevisadpaibul
Pimchanok Luevisadpaibul
Pimchanok Luevisadpaibul
Pimchanok Luevisadpaibul
Pimchanok Luevisadpaibul
Pimchanok Luevisadpaibul